Trud Stadium is a multi-purpose stadium in Krasnodar. It was the home ground of resurrected FC Kuban Krasnodar and Kubanochka Krasnodar. Now is the home arena of 
RC Kuban, with a capacity of 3,000 people. It was built in 1958.

History
Since 2007, Trud Stadium is the home ground of RC Kuban.

On 5 August 2018, resurrected by fans and former FC Kuban footballers team played here its first official match in the Krasnodar Krai Regional League.

References

External links
  
  

Sports venues completed in 1958
Sports venues built in the Soviet Union
Football venues in Russia
FC Kuban Krasnodar
FC Krasnodar
Kubanochka Krasnodar
RC Kuban
Multi-purpose stadiums in Russia
Buildings and structures in Krasnodar
Rugby union stadiums in Russia
Sport in Krasnodar